Jordanita subsolana is a moth of the family Zygaenidae. It is found from southern Spain though the southern part of central Europe, Italy, the Balkan Peninsula and Greece to southern Russia and Ukraine, Turkey and Transcaucasia up to the Altai.

Adults are on wing from the end of June to the start of August in central Europe and from May to July in the southern part of the range.

Various populations live more or less monophagous on various host plants. In Spain, larvae have been recorded on Carduncellus monospeliensium, while they have been recorded on Cirsium eriophorum in France, Italy, Switzerland and southern Austria. In Germany, larvae feed on Carlina vulgaris and in eastern Austria, the Czech Republic, Slovakia and Hungary the food plant is Echinops spaherocephalus. Young larvae mine the leaves of their host plant. The mine has the form of a fleck mine. The opening is a slit at the side of the mine.

The species overwinters in the larval stage. After hibernation, the larvae feed on the leaves of their host plant. Later instars feed on the heart of the plant and final instar larvae bore the roots, where pupation takes place in a dark brown cocoon.

References

C. M. Naumann, W. G. Tremewan: The Western Palaearctic Zygaenidae. Apollo Books, Stenstrup 1999,

External links
Europaea

Procridinae
Moths of Europe
Moths of Asia
Moths described in 1862